The City of North Battleford is in Treaty 6 Territory, in the heartland of the Métis. A vibrant community that draws visitors, shoppers, and facility users from all over northwest Saskatchewan, the City of North Battleford is home to thriving local businesses and world-class recreational amenities. 

The gateway to northwest Saskatchewan, North Battleford is situated in an outdoor recreation enthusiast's paradise - close proximity to Saskatchewan's premiere Ski Hill Table Mountain, Battlefords Provincial Park, with incredible lakes within nearby driving distance. 

North Battleford is the eighth largest city in the province and is directly across the North Saskatchewan River from the Town of Battleford. Together, the two communities are known as "The Battlefords" and strong regional partnerships have been developed between the municipalities and neighbouring First Nations communities in the area.

North Battleford also borders the Rural Municipality of North Battleford No. 437, and within North Battleford City limits is an unusual feature - Canada's only remaining Crown Colony, the North Battleford Crown Colony (census subdivision).

The Battlefords are served by the Yellowhead Highway and Highway 4, Highway 26, Highway 29, and Highway 40.

History

For thousands of years prior to European settlement, succeeding cultures of indigenous peoples lived in the area. The Battlefords area (including the present city of North Battleford and town of Battleford) was home to several historic indigenous groups, including the Algonquian-speaking Cree and Blackfeet as well as Siouan Assiniboine First Nation band governments, who contested for control of local resources.

Early European settlement began as a result of fur trading by French colonists in the late 18th century. The Canadians founded Fort Montaigne d'Aigle (Eagle Hills Fort)  nine miles below the confluence of the Saskatchewan and Battle Rivers in 1778. A year later the fort was abandoned following conflict between traders and natives.

Permanent European settlement in the area centred around the town of Battleford, founded 1875 and located on the south side of the North Saskatchewan River. Battleford served as capital of the North-West Territories between 1876 and 1883.

In 1905, the construction of the Canadian Northern Railway main line to Edmonton placed the line on the north side of the North Saskatchewan River. North Battleford, built along the railway line, was incorporated as a village in 1906, as a town in 1907, and as a city (with a population of 5,000) in 1913.

The Assyrians were one of the first settlers of the area in and around North Battleford. The immigrant colony comprised 36 men and a few women from the town of Urmia in northwestern Persia. It was established in 1903 by Dr. Isaac Adams, an Assyrian Presbyterian missionary. In 1907, 40 more settlers arrived. Eventually, due to economic hardships, Dr. Isaac Adams and a few close relatives emigrated to Turlock, California. The descendants of the families who remained in North Battleford have names that are Assyrian in origin. Examples of Assyrian family names include Bakus, Essau, and Odishaw.

Population growth stagnated until the 1940s and then grew to approximately 10,000 by the 1960s.
The city has grown into an administrative centre and service hub for the economic, education, health and social needs of the region.

North Battleford used STV-PR in its city elections from 1920 to 1924.

The Latter Rain Revival, a Christian movement, started here in 1946–48.

Historic sites

A number of heritage buildings are located within the city. The North Battleford Public Library was built in 1916 with a $15,000 grant from the Carnegie Foundation of New York. and the Canadian National Railways Station was built in 1956. The iconic Water Tower in North Battleford illuminates the skyline at night. The City of North Battleford is working with Cenovus Energy to replace the lighting on the water tower in 2023, allowing for coloured and energy-efficient lighting to be added to the structure.

Demographics 

In the late 2000s many Ruthenians have emigrated to Canada, concentrating in North Battleford. Most of them came from the same town: Ruski Krstur.

Crime rate
In 2021, North Battleford was ranked at the top of Statistics Canada's "Crime Severity Index", a weighted measure of crime per capita in communities of more than 10,000 residents. In response, the City of North Battleford has developed several proactive measures and public promotion to educate residents  and to enhance community safety. These efforts are mostly to reduce the amount of crimes of opportunity such as mischief and theft under $5000. 

Mischief files comprise 30% of the reported files in North Battleford, while another 10% of the files listed on the Crime Severity Index are related to bench warrants and breaches of probation stemming from the regional courthouse within the City. 

The common misnomer as it relates to North Battleford is that it experiences frequent violent crime - which, in examining the data that determines the Crime Severity Index in Canada, is untrue.

Climate

North Battleford experiences a humid continental climate (Köppen climate classification Dfb).

Government
North Battleford is represented in the provincial Legislative Assembly by the member for The Battlefords.

It is represented in the House of Commons by the member for Battlefords-Lloydminster.

In 2019 on Indigenous Peoples Day, the City of North Battleford joined the Town of Battleford, Sweetgrass First Nation, Little Pine First Nation, Saulteaux First Nation, Moosomin First Nation, and Lucky Man Cree Nation in the signing of a historic document, the Sacichawasihc Relationship Agreement. This formed the framework for the Battlefords Regional Community Coalition, where leadership from these municipalities and First Nations have formed a group that works together to improve relationships and join together to provide support for residents of the Battlefords region.

Furthermore, in 2021, the City of North Battleford officially joined the Coalition of Inclusive Municipalities to demonstrate the City's intentions to continue building an inclusive community where everyone has an equal chance at participating in the City's economic, political, social, cultural, and recreational life.

Attractions

North Battleford is the home of one of four branches of the Saskatchewan Western Development Museum. This branch focuses on the agricultural history of Saskatchewan, including a pioneer village. A prominent feature is the former Saskatchewan Wheat Pool grain elevator No. 889 from Keatley, Saskatchewan. The grain elevator was moved to the museum grounds in 1983.

The city also has the Allen Sapp Gallery, featuring the noted Cree painter.

Sports and recreation

The North Battleford Access Communications Centre, a 2,500-seat multi-purpose arena, is home to the Battlefords North Stars ice hockey team of the Saskatchewan Junior Hockey League.
It is also home to the North Battleford Kinsmen Indoor Rodeo, held annually in April.

The Innovation Credit Union "InnovationPlex" Recreational and Cultural Centre opened in 2013 and includes the Dekker Centre for the Performing Arts, the Northland Power Curling Centre, the NationsWEST Field House, and the Battlefords CO-OP Aquatic Centre.

The North Battleford Golf & Country Club is located along the beautiful North Saskatchewan River. This picturesque 18-hole course is said to be one of the most challenging in the province. 

Saskatchewan's best ski hill, Table Mountain Regional Park, is a short drive from the City of North Battleford. Table Mountain has something for every skier and rider, and the park spans 45km of varying terrain and well-groomed runs.

Infrastructure

The City of North Battleford has two water treatment plants and provides test samples of their drinking water every three months to the Water Security Agency to ensure provision of quality drinking water for residents. In addition, the City publishes its yearly water quality reports on the City's website to provide information to the general public. 

The City of North Battleford is in the final stages of constructing a $16 million sewer force main project in 2023 to provide long-term sanitary services for community residents and to have infrastructure that supports long-term community growth.

The North Battleford Energy Centre, a natural gas-fired power station owned by Northland Power, has been operational since 2013.

Transportation
North Battleford is served by the North Battleford Airport, while the North Battleford/Hamlin Airport is no longer in use. The city also has Battlefords Transit, a public transit system, in addition to the book-as-needed "Handi-Bus" for people experiencing disabilities.

Local media

Newspaper
BattlefordsNOW.com is an online local news site focusing on what's happening "right NOW" in the Battlefords and surrounding areas. The local newspaper is the Battlefords News-Optimist. It is published weekly on Thursdays, and has circulation in the surrounding area.

Radio
Three local radio stations serve the area: CJNB, CJCQ-FM ("Q98"), and CJHD-FM ("93.3 The Rock").

Television
The Battlefords were served by CFQC-TV-2 channel 6, an analogue repeater of CTV station CFQC-DT Saskatoon. Access Communications provides local cable TV and news coverage to the area.

Notable people

Andrew Albers: baseball player
Lloyd Axworthy: Canadian politician and spokesman
Wade Belak: former NHL player
Colby Cave: former NHL player
Ron Delorme: former NHL player
Deidra Dionne: Canadian freestyle skier, Olympic medalist
Lillian Dyck: Neuroscientist, Canadian senator
Johnny Esaw: former sports' broadcaster, former vice-president of CTV Sports
Bob Francis: former NHL player, NHL coach
Emile Francis: former NHL player, coach, and general manager
Ray Hare: former NFL running back
Bruce Hoffort: former NHL Goaltender
Dale Hoganson: former NHL player
Bill Hunter: hockey coach, owner, and general manager; founder of the Western Hockey League
Carole James: politician, former leader of the British Columbia New Democratic Party, Deputy Premier of British Columbia
Dave King: NHL coach
Cole Knutson: Métis classical musician 
Skip Krake: former NHL centre
Jody Lehman: former EIHL goalie
Bernie Lukowich: former NHL player
Alistair MacLeod: author
Merlin Malinowski: former NHL right winger
Rueben Mayes: former NFL player
Joni Mitchell: musician, artist
Nancy Nash: Singer and Performer
Brian Plummer: Musician
Lee Richardson: Canadian politician
Allen Sapp: Canadian Cree painter
Corey Schwab: former NHL goalie
Gregg Sheppard: former NHL forward
Fiona Lesley Smith: Member of the Canada women's national ice hockey team
Herbert Sparrow: former Canadian senator
Len Taylor: former Saskatchewan cabinet minister and federal MP
Al Tuer: former NHL defenceman
Jesse Wallin: former NHL defenceman, WJC Gold Medallist, WHL GM/Head Coach
W. Brett Wilson: Entrepreneur and Philanthropist

References

Notes

External links

 
Cities in Saskatchewan
Pannonian Rusyns
Rusyn Canadian
Serbian-Canadian culture
Ukrainian-Canadian culture in Saskatchewan